Shubhvivah is an Indian Marathi language drama television series. It starred Yashoman Apte and Madhura Deshpande in lead roles. It is produced under the banner of Tell-a-Tale Media. It premiered from 16 January 2023 on Star Pravah by replacing Mulgi Zali Ho. It is an official remake of Telugu TV series Chelleli Kapuram.

Cast

Main 
 Yashoman Apte as Akash Lavdya
 Madhura Deshpande as Bhumi

Recurring 
 Abhijeet Shwetachandra as Abhijit Lavdya
 Kunjika Kalvint as Pournima
 Akshay Jadhav as Atharva Lavdya
 Kajal Patil as Manasi
 Vishakha Subhedar as Ragini
 Sheetal Shukla as Surekha
 Mrunal Deshpande as Nilambari
 Ruchir Gurav as Prashant Lavdya
 Vijay Patwardhan as Rajaram
 Manoj Kolhatkar

References

External links 
 Shubhvivah at Disney+ Hotstar

Marathi-language television shows
2023 Indian television series debuts
Star Pravah original programming